Adam Raymond Healey (born in Rome, Italy) is an Internet entrepreneur.  

Adam is the Founder & CEO of Missionbear, a strategic consultancy that works with e-commerce entrepreneurs.

Previously, he was the co-founder & CEO of Borrowed & Blue, a web site serving the wedding industry, based in Charlottesville, Virginia.  Borrowed & Blue was founded in 2011 and sold to Zola in 2017.

Before that, Healey was the co-founder & CEO of hotelicopter, a hotel meta-search engine that he sold in 2011 to Room Key, a consortium of the six largest hotel chains in the world. 

The hotel search engine hotelicopter (previously called VibeAgent) was featured by The Washington Post, Forbes, MSNBC, and USA Today.  

He launched his first web startup, Samba Digital Media, in Prague in 1999 at the age of 24, where he built the company into one of the largest e-services firms in Central Europe.

Healey is also a lecturer in Entrepreneurship at the McIntire School of Commerce at the University of Virginia, and serves on the board of the local startup hub HackCville.

In 2013 Healey was named one of the ‘Top 50 Entrepreneurs’ in Virginia by the Center for Innovative Technology.  Healey was also featured in Entrepreneur magazine's April 2008 issue about entrepreneurs with MBAs.

References

External links
Borrowed & Blue's Official Site
Room Key's Official Site
Adam Healey's blog
Raven Society Official Site

1974 births
Living people
American male bloggers
American bloggers
American computer businesspeople
American Internet celebrities